The 1981 Big Ten Conference baseball tournament was held at Ray Fisher Stadium on the campus of the University of Michigan in Ann Arbor, Michigan, from May 15 through 17. The top two teams from the regular season in each division participated in the double-elimination tournament, the first such event sponsored by the Big Ten Conference to determine the league champion. Michigan won the first tournament championship and earned the Big Ten Conference's automatic bid to the 1981 NCAA Division I baseball tournament

Format and seeding 
The 1981 tournament was a 4-team double-elimination tournament, with seeds determined by conference regular season winning percentage within each division. The top seed from each division played the second seed from the opposite division in the first round.

Tournament

All-Tournament Team 
The following players were named to the All-Tournament Team.

Most Outstanding Player 
Gerry Hool was named Most Outstanding Player. Hool was a catcher for Michigan.

References 

Tournament
Big Ten baseball tournament
Big Ten Baseball Tournament
Big Ten baseball tournament